In grammar, the vocative case (abbreviated ) is a grammatical case which is used for a noun that identifies a person (animal, object, etc.) being addressed, or occasionally for the noun modifiers (determiners, adjectives, participles, and numerals) of that noun. A vocative expression is an expression of direct address by which the identity of the party spoken to is set forth expressly within a sentence. For example, in the sentence "I don't know, John," John is a vocative expression that indicates the party being addressed, as opposed to the sentence "I don't know John" in which "John" is the direct object of the verb "know".

Historically, the vocative case was an element of the Indo-European case system and existed in Latin, Sanskrit and Greek. Many modern Indo-European languages (English, Spanish, etc.) have lost the vocative case, but others retain it, including the Baltic languages, some Celtic languages and most Slavic languages. Some linguists, such as Albert Thumb,(de) argue that the vocative form is not a case but a special form of nouns not belonging to any case, as vocative expressions are not related syntactically to other words in sentences. Pronouns usually lack vocative forms.

Indo-European languages

Comparison
Distinct vocative forms are assumed to have existed in all early Indo-European languages and survive in some. Here is, for example, the Indo-European word for "wolf" in various languages:

The elements separated with hyphens denote the stem, the so-called thematic vowel of the case and the actual suffix. In Latin, for example, the nominative case is lupus and the vocative case is lupe, but the accusative case is lupum. The asterisks before the Proto-Indo-European words means that they are theoretical reconstructions and are not attested in a written source. The symbol ◌̩ (vertical line below) indicates a consonant serving as a vowel (it should appear directly below the "l" or "r" in these examples but may appear after them on some systems from issues of font display). All final consonants were lost in Proto-Slavic, so both the nominative and vocative Old Church Slavonic forms do not have true endings, only reflexes of the old thematic vowels.

The vocative ending changes the stem consonant in Old Church Slavonic because of the so-called First Palatalization. Most modern Slavic languages that retain the vocative case have altered the ending to avoid the change: Bulgarian вълко occurs far more frequently than вълче.

Baltic languages

Lithuanian

The vocative is distinct in singular and identical to the nominative in the plural, for all inflected nouns. Nouns with a nominative singular ending in -a have a vocative singular usually identically written but distinct in accentuation.

In Lithuanian, the form that a given noun takes depends on its declension class and, sometimes, on its gender. There have been several changes in history, the last being the -ai ending formed between the 18th and 19th centuries. The older forms are listed under "other forms".

Some nouns of the e- and a- stems declensions (both proper ones and not) are stressed differently: "aikštė": "aikšte!" (square); "tauta": "tauta!". In addition, nouns of e-stems have an ablaut of long vowel ė in nominative and short vowel e    in vocative. In pronunciation, ė is close-mid vowel , and e is open-mid vowel .

The vocative of diminutive nouns with the suffix -(i)ukas most frequently has no ending: broliùk "brother!", etc. A less frequent alternative is the ending -ai, which is also slightly dialectal: broliùkai, etc.

Colloquially, some personal names with a masculine -(i)(j)o stem and diminutives with the suffixes -elis, -ėlis have an alternative vocative singular form characterized by a zero ending (i.e. the stem alone acts as the voc. sg.): Adõm "Adam!" in addition to Adõmai, Mýkol "Michael!" in addition to Mýkolai, vaikẽl "kid!" in addition to vaikẽli, etc.

Celtic languages

Goidelic languages

Irish
The vocative case in Irish operates in a similar fashion to Scottish Gaelic. The principal marker is the vocative particle a, which causes lenition of the initial letter.

In the singular there is no special form, except for first declension nouns. These are masculine nouns that end in a broad (non-palatal) consonant, which is made slender (palatal) to build the singular vocative (as well as the singular genitive and plural nominative). Adjectives are also lenited. In many cases this means that (in the singular) masculine vocative expressions resemble the genitive and feminine vocative expressions resemble the nominative.

The vocative plural is usually the same as the nominative plural except, again, for first declension nouns. In the standard language first declension nouns show the vocative plural by adding -a. In the spoken dialects the vocative plural is often has the same form as the nominative plural (as with the nouns of other declensions) or the dative plural (e.g. a fhearaibh! = Men!)

Scottish Gaelic
The vocative case in Scottish Gaelic follows the same basic pattern as Irish. The vocative case causes lenition of the initial consonant of nouns. Lenition changes the initial sound of the word (or name).

In addition, masculine nouns are slenderized if possible (that is, in writing, an 'i' is inserted before the final consonant) This also changes the pronunciation of the word.

Also, the particle a is placed before the noun unless it begins with a vowel (or f followed immediately by a vowel, which becomes silent when lenited). Examples of the use of the vocative personal names (as in Irish):

The name "Hamish" is just the English spelling of "Sheumais" (the vocative of "Seumas" and pronounced "Hamish"), and thus is actually a Gaelic vocative. Likewise, the name "Vairi" is an English spelling of "Mhàiri," the vocative for Màiri.

Manx
The basic pattern is similar to Irish and Scottish. The vocative is confined to personal names, in which it is common. Foreign names (not of Manx origin) are not used in the vocative. The vocative case causes lenition of the initial consonant of names. It can be used with the particle "y".

The name "Voirrey" is actually the Manx vocative of "Moirrey" (Mary).

Brythonic languages

Welsh

Welsh lacks case declension but marks vocative constructions by lenition of the initial consonant of the word, with no obligatory particle. Despite its use being less common, it is still used in formal address: the common phrase foneddigion a boneddigesau means "gentlemen and ladies", with the initial consonant of boneddigion undergoing a soft mutation; the same is true of gyfeillion ("[dear] friends") in which cyfeillion has been lenited. It is often used to draw attention to at public notices orally and written – teachers will say "Blant" (mutation of "children") and signage such as one right show mutation of "myfyrwyr" (students) to draw attention to the importance of the notice.

Germanic languages

English

The vocative is not generally marked in English in regular communication. A vocative expression in English may be marked by the particle "O" preceding the noun; this is often used in English translations of languages that do have the vocative case. It is often seen in the King James Version of the Bible: "O ye of little faith" (in Matthew 8:26). While it is not strictly archaic, it is sometimes used to "archaeise" speech; it is often seen as very formal, and sees use in rhetoric and poetry, or as a comedic device to subvert modern speech.  Another example is the recurrent use of the phrase "O (my) Best Beloved" by Rudyard Kipling in his Just So Stories. The use of O may be considered a form of clitic and should not be confused with the interjection oh. However, as the Oxford English Dictionary points out, "O" and "oh" were originally used interchangeably. With the advent of "oh" as a written interjection, however, "O" is the preferred modern spelling in vocative phrases.

Modern English commonly uses the objective case for vocative expressions but sets them off from the rest of the sentences with pauses as interjections, rendered in writing as commas (the vocative comma). Two common examples of vocative expressions in English are the phrases "Mr. President" and "Madam Chairwoman".

Some traditional texts use Jesu, the Latin vocative form of Jesus. One of the best-known examples is Jesu, Joy of Man's Desiring.

German dialects
In some German dialects, like the Ripuarian dialect of Cologne, it is common to use the (gender-appropriate) article before a person's name. In the vocative phrase then the article is, as in Venetian and Catalan, omitted. Thus, the determiner precedes nouns in all cases except the vocative. Any noun not preceded by an article or other determiner is in the vocative case. It is most often used to address someone or some group of living beings, usually in conjunction with an imperative construct. It can also be used to address dead matter as if the matter could react or to tell something astonishing or just happening such as "Your nose is dripping."

Colognian examples:

Icelandic
The vocative case generally does not appear in Icelandic, but a few words retain an archaic vocative declension from Latin, such as the word Jesús, which is Jesú in the vocative. That comes from Latin, as the Latin for Jesus in the nominative is Jesus and its vocative is Jesu. 
That is also the case in traditional English (without the accent) (see above):
 

The native words sonur ("son") and vinur ("friend") also sometimes appear in the shortened forms son and vin in vocative phrases. Additionally, adjectives in vocative phrases are always weakly declined, but elsewhere with proper nouns, they would usually be declined strongly:

Norwegian
Nouns in Norwegian are not inflected for the vocative case, but adjectives qualifying those nouns are; adjectival adjuncts modifying vocative nouns are inflected for the definite (see: Norwegian language#Adjectives). The definite and plural inflections are in most cases identical, so it is more easily observable with adjectives that inflect for plural and definite differently, e.g. liten being lille when definite, but små when plural, an instance of suppletion.

In several Norwegian dialects, north of an isogloss running from Oslo to Bergen, names in argument position are associated with proprial articles, e.g. gendered pronouns such as han ('he') or hun ('she'), which either precede or follow the noun in question. This is not the case when in vocative constructions.

Greek
In Ancient Greek, the vocative case is usually identical to the nominative case, with the exception of masculine second-declension nouns (ending in -ος) and third-declension nouns.

Second-declension masculine nouns have a regular vocative ending in -ε.  Third-declension nouns with one syllable ending in -ς have a vocative that is identical to the nominative (νύξ, night); otherwise, the stem (with necessary alterations, such as dropping final consonants) serves as the vocative (nom. πόλις, voc. πόλι; nom. σῶμα, gen. σώματος, voc. σῶμα).  Irregular vocatives exist as well, such as nom. Σωκράτης, voc. Σώκρατες.

In Modern Greek, second-declension masculine nouns still have a vocative ending in -ε. However, the accusative case is often used as a vocative in informal speech for a limited number of nouns, and always used for certain modern Greek person names: "Έλα εδώ, Χρήστο" "Come here, Christos" instead of "...Χρήστε". Other nominal declensions use the same form in the vocative as the accusative in formal or informal speech, with the exception of learned Katharevousa forms that are inherited from Ancient Greek Ἕλλην (Demotic Έλληνας, "Greek man"), which have the same nominative and vocative forms instead.

Iranian languages

Kurdish
Kurdish has a vocative case. For instance, in the dialect of Kurmanji, it is created by adding the suffix -o at the end of masculine words and the -ê suffix at the end of feminine ones. In the Jafi dialect of Sorani it is created by adding the suffix of -i at the end of names.

Instead of the vocative case, forms of address may be created by using the grammatical particles lê (feminine) and lo (masculine):

Indo-Aryan languages

Hindi-Urdu 
In Hindi-Urdu (Hindustani), the vocative case has same form as the nominative case for all singular nouns except for the singular masculine nouns that terminate in the vowel आ /a:/ (ā) and for all nouns in their plural forms the vocative case is always distinct from the nominative case. Adjectives in Hindi-Urdu also have a vocative case form. In the absence of a noun argument, some adjectives decline like masculine nouns that do not end in आ /a:/ (ā). The vocative case has many similarities with the oblique case in Hindustani.

Sanskrit
In Sanskrit, the vocative (सम्बोधन विभक्ति sambodhana vibhakti) has the same form as the nominative except in the singular. In vowel-stem nouns, if there is a –ḥ in the nominative, it is omitted and the stem vowel may be altered: –ā and –ĭ become –e, –ŭ becomes –o, –ī and –ū become short and –ṛ becomes –ar. Consonant-stem nouns have no ending in the vocative:

The vocative form is the same as the nominative except in the masculine and feminine singular.

Slavic languages

Old Church Slavonic 
Old Church Slavonic has a distinct vocative case for many stems of singular masculine and feminine nouns, otherwise it is identical to the nominative. When different from the nominative, the vocative is simply formed from the nominative by appending either -e (rabъ: rabe "slave") or -o (ryba: rybo "fish"), but occasionally -u (krai: kraju "border", synъ: synu "son", vračь: vraču "physician") and -i (kostь: kosti "bone", gostь:gosti "guest", dьnь: dьni "day", kamy: kameni "stone") appear. Nouns ending with -ьcь have a vocative ending of -če (otьcь: otьče "father", kupьcь: kupьče "merchant"), likewise nouns ending with -dzь assume the vocative suffix -že (kъnědzь: kъněže "prince"). This is similar to Greek, Latin, Lithuanian, and Sanskrit, which also employ the -e suffix in vocatives.

Bulgarian
Unlike most other Slavic languages, Bulgarian has lost case marking for nouns. However, Bulgarian preserves vocative forms. Traditional male names usually have a vocative ending.

More-recent names and foreign names may have a vocative form but it is rarely used (Ричарде, instead of simply Ричард Richard, sounds unusual or humorous to native speakers).

Vocative phrases like господине министре (Mr. Minister) have been almost completely replaced by nominative forms, especially in official writing. Proper nouns usually also have vocative forms, but they are used less frequently. Here are some proper nouns that are frequently used in vocative:

Vocative case forms also normally exist for female given names:

Except for forms that end in -е, they are considered rude and are normally avoided. For female kinship terms, the vocative is always used:

Czech
In Czech, the vocative (vokativ, or 5. pád – "the fifth case") usually differs from the nominative in masculine and feminine nouns in the singular.

In older common Czech (19th century), vocative form was sometimes replaced by nominative form in case of female names ("Lojzka, dej pokoj!") and in case of male nouns past a title ("pane učitel!", "pane továrník!", "pane Novák!"). This phenomenon was caused mainly by the German influence, and almost disappeared from the modern Czech. It can be felt as rude, discourteous or uncultivated, or as familiar, and is associated also with Slovakian influence (from the Czechoslovak Army) or Russian. In informal speech, it is common (but grammatically incorrect) to use the male surname (see also Czech name) in the nominative to address men: pane Novák! instead of pane Nováku! (Female surnames are adjectives, and their nominative and vocative have the same form: see Czech declension.) Using the vocative is strongly recommended in official and written styles.

Polish
In Polish, the vocative (wołacz) is formed with feminine nouns usually taking -o except those that end in -sia, -cia, -nia, and -dzia, which take -u, and those that end in -ść, which take -i. Masculine nouns generally follow the complex pattern of the locative case, with the exception of a handful of words such as Bóg → Boże ("God"), ojciec → ojcze ("father") and chłopiec → chłopcze ("boy"). Neuter nouns and all plural nouns have the same form in the nominative and the vocative:

The latter form of the vocative of człowiek (human) is now considered poetical.

The nominative is increasingly used instead of the vocative to address people with their proper names. In other contexts the vocative remains prevalent. It is used:
To address an individual with the function, title, other attribute, family role
Panie doktorze (Doctor!), Panie prezesie! (Chairman!)
Przybywasz za późno, pływaku (You arrive too late, swimmer)
synu (son), mamo (mum), tato (dad)
After adjectives, demonstrative pronouns and possessive pronouns
Nie rozumiesz mnie, moja droga Basiu! (You don't understand me, my dear Basia!)
To address an individual in an offensive or condescending manner:
Zamknij się, pajacu! ("Shut up, you buffoon!")
Co się gapisz, idioto? ("What are you staring at, idiot?")
Nie znasz się, baranie, to nie pisz! ("Stop writing, idiot, you don't know what you're doing!")
Spadaj, wieśniaku! ("Get lost, hillbilly!")
After "Ty" (second person singular pronoun)
Ty kłamczuchu! (You liar!)
Set expressions:
(O) Matko!, (O) Boże!, chłopie

The vocative is also often employed in affectionate and endearing contexts such as Kocham Cię, Krzysiu! ("I love you, Chris!") or Tęsknię za Tobą, moja Żono ("I miss you, my wife."). In addition, the vocative form sometimes takes the place of the nominative in informal conversations: Józiu przyszedł instead of "Józio przyszedł" ("Joey's arrived"). When referring to someone by their first name, the nominative commonly takes the place of the vocative as well: Ania, chodź tu! instead of Aniu, chodź tu! ("Anne, come here!").

Russian

Historic vocative
The historic Slavic vocative has been lost in Russian and is now used only in archaic expressions. Several of them, mostly of Old Church Slavonic origin, are common in colloquial Russian: "Боже!" (Bože, vocative of "Бог" Bog, "God") and "Боже мой!" (Bože moj, "My God!"), and "Господи!" (Gospodi, vocative of "Господь" Gospodj, "Lord"), which can also be expressed as "Господи Иисусе!" (Gospodi Iisuse!, Iisuse vocative of "Иисус" Iisus, "Jesus"). The vocative is also used in prayers: "Отче наш!" (Otče naš, "Our Father!"). Such expressions are used to express strong emotions (much like English "O my God!"), and are often combined ("Господи, Боже мой"). More examples of the historic vocative can be found in other Biblical quotes that are sometimes used as proverbs: "Врачу, исцелися сам" (Vraču, iscelisia sam, "Physician, heal thyself", nom. "врач", vrač). Vocative forms are also used in modern Church Slavonic. The patriarch and bishops of the Russian Orthodox Church are addressed as "владыко" (vladyko, hegemon, nom. "владыка", vladyka). In the latter case, the vocative is often also incorrectly used for the nominative to refer to bishops and patriarchs.

New vocative
In modern colloquial Russian, given names and a small family of terms often take a special "shortened" form that some linguists consider to be a re-emerging vocative case. It is used only for given names and nouns that end in -a and -я, which are sometimes dropped in the vocative form: "Лен, где ты?" ("Lena, where are you?"). It is basically equivalent to "Лена, где ты?" but suggests a positive personal and emotional bond between the speaker and the person being addressed. Names that end in -я then acquire a soft sign: "Оль!" = "Оля!" ("Olga!"). In addition to given names, the form is often used with words like "мама" (mom) and "папа" (dad), which would be respectively shortened to "мам" and "пап". The plural form is used with words such as "ребят", "девчат" (nom: "ребята", "девчата" guys, gals).

Such usage differs from the historic vocative, which would be "Лено" and is not related.

Serbo-Croatian 
Distinct vocatives exist only for singular masculine and feminine nouns. Nouns of the neuter gender and all nouns in plural have a vocative equal to the nominative. All vocative suffixes known from Old Church Slavonic also exist in Serbo-Croatian.

The vocative in Serbo-Croatian is formed according to one of three types of declension, which are classes of nouns having equal declension suffixes.

First declension 
The first declension comprises masculine nouns that end with a consonant. These have a vocative suffix of either -e (doktor: doktore "doctor") or -u (gospodar: gospodaru "master").

Nouns terminating in -or have the -e vocative suffix: (doktor: doktore "doctor", major: majore "major", majstor: majstore "artisan") also nouns possessing an unsteady a (vetar: vetre "wind", svekar: svekre "father-in-law") and the noun car: care "emperor". All other nouns in this class form the vocative with -u: gospodar: gospodaru "master", pastir: pastiru "shepherd", inženjer: inženjeru "engineer", pisar: pisaru "scribe", sekretar: sekretaru "secretary".

In particular, masculine nouns ending with a palatal or prepalatal consonant j, lj, nj, č. dž. ć, đ. š form vocatives with the -u suffix: heroj: heroju "hero", prijatelj: prijatelju "friend", konj: konju "horse", vozač: vozaču "driver", mladić: mladiću "youngster", kočijaš: kočijašu "coachman", muž: mužu "husband".

Nouns ending with the velars -k, -g and -h are palatalized to -č, -ž, -š in the vocative: vojnik: vojniče "soldier", drug: druže "comrade", duh: duše "ghost". A final -c becomes -č in the vocative: stric: striče "uncle", lovac: lovče "hunter". Likewise, a final -z becomes -ž in only two cases: knez: kneže "prince" and vitez: viteže "knight".

The loss of the unsteady a can trigger a sound change by hardening of consonants, as in vrabac: vrapče "sparrow" (not vrabče), lisac: lišče "male fox" (not lisče) and ženomrzac: ženomršče "misogynist" (not ženomrzče). There may be a loss of -t before -c like in otac: oče "father" (instead of otče). svetac: sveče "saint" (instead of svetče). When these phonetic alterations would substantially change the base noun, the vocative remains equal to the nominative, for example tetak "uncle", mačak "male cat", bratac "cousin". This also holds true for foreign names ending with -k, -g and -h like Džek (Jack), Dag (Doug), King, Hajnrih.

Male names ending with -o and -e have a vocative equal to the infinitive: Marko, Mihailo, Danilo, Đorđe, Pavle, Radoje etc.

Second declension 
The second declension affects nouns with the ending -a. These are mainly of feminine but sometimes also of masculine gender. These nouns have a vocative suffix -o: riba: ribo "fish", sluga: slugo "servant", kolega: kolego "colleague", poslovođa: poslovođo "manager".

Exemptions to this rule are male and female names, which have a vocative equal to the nominative, e. g. Vera, Zorka, Olga, Marija, Gordana, Nataša, Nikola, Kosta, Ilija etc. However, this is different for twosyllabic names with an ascending accent such as Nâda, Zôra, Mîca, Nêna and the male names Pêra, Bôža, Pâja etc., which form vocatives with -o: Nâdo, Zôro, Mîco, Pêro, Bôžo, Pâjo etc.

Denominations of relatives like mama "mom", tata "dad", deda "grandfather", tetka "aunt", ujna "aunt" (mother's brother's wife), strina "aunt" (father's brother's wife), baba "grandmother" have vocatives equal to the nominative. This also holds true for country names ending in -ska, -čka, -ška.

Nouns ending with the diminutive suffix -ica that consist of three or more syllables have a vocative with -e: učiteljica: učiteljice "female teacher", drugarica: drugarice "girlfriend", tatica: tatice "daddy", mamica: mamice "mommy". This also applies to female names Danica: Danice, Milica: Milice, Zorica: Zorice, and the male names Perica: Perice, Tomica: Tomice. Nouns of this class that can be applied to both males and females usually have a vocative ending of -ico (pijanica: pijanico "drunkard", izdajica: izdajico "traitor", kukavica: kukavico "coward"), but vocatives with -ice are also seen.

The use of vocative endings for names varies among Serbo-Croatian dialects. People in Croatia often use only nominative forms as vocatives, while others are more likely to use grammatical vocatives.

Third declension 
The third declension affects feminine nouns ending with a consonant. The vocative is formed by appending the suffix -i to the nominative (reč: reči "word", noć: noći "night").

Slovak
Until the end of the 1980s, the existence of a distinct vocative case in Slovak was recognised and taught at schools. Today, the case is no longer considered to exist except for a few archaic examples of the original vocative remaining in religious, literary or ironic contexts:

In everyday use, the Czech vocative is sometimes retrofitted to certain words:

Another stamp of vernacular vocative is emerging, presumably under the influence of Hungarian for certain family members or proper names:

Ukrainian
Ukrainian has retained the vocative case mostly as it was in Proto-Slavic:
{| class="wikitable"
! colspan="3" |Masculine nouns
! colspan="3" |Feminine nouns
|-
!Nominative
!Vocative
!Translation
!Nominative
!Vocative
!Translation
|-
|бог boh
|боже bože
|god
|матуся matusja
|матусю matusju
|minnie
|-
|друг druh
|друже druže
|friend
|неня nenja
|нене nene
|nanny
|-
|брат brat
|брате brate
|brother
|бабця babcja
|бабцю babcju
|granny
|-
|чоловік čolovik
|чоловіче čoloviče
|man
|жінка žinka
|жінко žinko
|woman
|-
|хлопець chlopec'''
|хлопче chlopče|boy
|дружина družyna|дружино družyno|wife
|-
|святий отець svjatyj otec|святий отче svjatyj otče
|Holy Father
|дівчина divčyna
|дівчино divčyno
|girl
|-
|пан pan
|пане pane
|sir, Mr.
|сестра sestra
|сестро sestro
|sister
|-
|приятель pryjatel|приятелю pryjatelju
|fellow
|людина ljudyna
|людино ljudyno
|human
|-
|батько bat'ko
|батьку bat'ku
|father
|
|
|
|-
|син syn
|сину synu
|son
|
|
|
|}
There are some exceptions:

It is used even for loanwords and foreign names:

It is obligatory for all native names:

It is used for patronymics:

Latin
In Latin, the form of the vocative case of a noun is often the same as the nominative. Exceptions include singular non-neuter second-declension nouns that end in -us in the nominative case. An example would be the famous line from Shakespeare, "Et tu, Brute?" (commonly translated as "And you, Brutus?"): Brute is the vocative case and Brutus would be the nominative.

Nouns that end in -ius end with -ī instead of the expected -ie. Thus, Julius becomes Julī and filius becomes filī. The shortening does not shift the accent so the vocative of Vergilius is Vergilī, with accent on the second syllable even though it is short. Nouns that end in -aius and -eius have vocatives that end in -aī or -eī even though the i in the nominative is consonantal.

First-declension and second-declension adjectives also have distinct vocative forms in the masculine singular if the nominative ends in -us, with the ending -e. Adjectives that end in -ius have vocatives in -ie so the vocative of eximius is eximie.

Nouns and adjectives that end in -eus do not follow the rules above. Meus forms the vocative irregularly as mī or meus, while Christian Deus does not have a distinct vocative and retains the form Deus. "My God!" in Latin is thus mī Deus!, but Jerome's Vulgate consistently used Deus meus as a vocative. Classical Latin did not use a vocative of deus either (in reference to pagan gods, the Romans used the suppletive form dive).

Romance languages
West Iberian languages
Portuguese drops the article to form the vocative. The vocative is always between commas and, like in many other languages, a particle Ó is commonly used:

In Extremaduran and Fala, some post-tonical vowels open in vocative forms of nouns, a new development that is unrelated to the Latin vocative case.

Catalan
Catalan drops the article to form the vocative.

French
Like English, French sometimes uses (or historically used) a particle Ô to mark vocative phrases rather than by change to the form of the noun.  A famous example is the title and first line of the Canadian national anthem, O Canada (French title: Ô Canada), a vocative phrase addressing Canada.

Romanian
The vocative case in Romanian is partly inherited, occasionally causing other morphophonemic changes (see also the article on Romanian nouns):

singular masculine/neuter: "-e" as in
"om": "omule!" (man, human being),
"băiat": "băiete!" or "băiatule!" (boy),
"văr": "vere!" (cousin),
"Ion": "Ioane!" (John);
singular feminine: "-o" as in
"soră": "soro!" (sister),
"nebună": "nebuno!" (mad woman), also in masculine (nebunul) 
"deșteaptă": "deșteapto!" (smart one (f), often used sarcastically),
"Ileana": "Ileano!" (Helen);
Since there is no -o vocative in Latin, it must have been borrowed from Slavic: compare the corresponding Bulgarian forms сестро (sestro), откачалко (otkachalko), Елено (Eleno).

plural, all genders: "-lor" as in
"frați": "fraților!" (brothers),
"boi": "boilor!" (oxen, used toward people as an invective),
"doamne și domni": "doamnelor și domnilor!" (ladies and gentlemen).

In formal speech, the vocative often simply copies the nominative/accusative form even when it does have its own form. That is because the vocative is often perceived as very direct and so can seem rude.

Venetian
Venetian has lost all case endings, like most other Romance languages. However, with feminine proper names the role of the vocative is played by the absence of the determiner: the personal article ła / l' usually precedes feminine names in other situations, even in predicates. Masculine names and other nouns lack articles and so rely on prosody to mark forms of address:

Predicative constructions:

Arabic

Properly speaking, Arabic has only three cases: nominative, accusative and genitive. However, a meaning similar to that conveyed by the vocative case in other languages is indicated by the use of the particle yā placed before a noun inflected in the nominative case (or accusative if the noun is in construct form). In English translations, it is often translated literally as O instead of being omitted. The particle yā was also used in the old Castilian language, because of Arabic influence via Mozarabic immigrations.

Mandarin
Mandarin uses no special inflected forms for address. However, special forms and morphemes (that are not inflections) exist for addressing.

Mandarin has several particles that can be attached to the word of address to mark certain special vocative forces, where appropriate. A common one is  a, attached to the end of the address word. For example,  rìjì "diary" becomes  rìjì'a.

Certain specialized vocative morphemes also exist, albeit with limited applicabilities. For instance, the Beijing dialect of Mandarin Chinese, to express strong feelings (especially negative ones) to someone, a neutral tone suffix -ei may be attached to certain address words. It is most commonly applied to the word  (sūnzi, "grandson"), to form sūnzei, meaning approximately "Hey you nasty one!". "kid; young one"), resulting in xiǎozei "Hey kiddo!".

Japanese

The vocative case is present in Japanese as the particle よ. This usage is often literary or poetic. For example:

In conversational Japanese, this same particle is often used at the end of a sentence to indicate assertiveness, certainty or emphasis.

Georgian
In Georgian, the vocative case is used to address the second-person singular and plural. For word roots that end with a consonant, the vocative case suffix is -o, and for the words that end with a vowel, it is  -v like in Old Georgian, but for some words, it is considered archaic. For example, kats- is the root for the word "man". If one addresses someone with the word, it becomes katso.

Adjectives are also declined in the vocative case. Just like nouns, consonant final stem adjectives take the suffix -o in the vocative case, and the vowel final stems are not changed:

lamazi kali "beautiful woman" (nominative case)
lamazo kalo! "beautiful woman!" (vocative case)

In the second phrase, both the adjective and the noun are declined. The personal pronouns are also used in the vocative case. Shen "you" (singular) and tkven "you" (plural) in the vocative case become she! and tkve, without the -n. Therefore, one could, for instance, say, with the declension of all of the elements:

She lamazo kalo! "you beautiful woman!"

Korean
The vocative case in Korean is commonly used with first names in casual situations by using the vocative case marker(호격 조사) 아 (a) if the name ends in a consonant and 야 (ya) if the name ends with a vowel:

미진이 집에 가? (Mijini jibe ga?) (Is Mijin going home?)

미진아, 집에 가? (Mijina, jibe ga?) (Mijin, are you going home?)

동배 뭐 해? (Dongbae mwo hae?) (What is Dongbae doing?)

동배야, 뭐 해? (Dongbaeya, mwo hae?) (Dongbae, what are you doing?)

In formal Korean, the marker 여 (yeo) or 이여 (iyeo) is used, the latter if the root ends with a consonant. Thus, a quotation of William S. Clark would be translated as follows:

소년이여, 야망을 가져라. (sonyeoniyeo, yamangeul gajyeora.) (Boys, be ambitious.)

The honorific infix 시 (si) is inserted in between the 이 (i) and 여 (yeo).

신이시여''', 부디 저들을 용서하소서. (sinisiyeo', budi jeodeureul yongseohasoseo.) (Oh god, please forgive them.)

In Middle Korean, there were three honorific classes of the vocative case:

Hungarian
Hungarian has a number of vocative-like constructions, even though it lacks an explicit vocative inflection.

Noun phrases in a vocative context always take the zero article. While noun phrases can take zero articles for other reasons, the lack of an article otherwise expected marks a vocative construction. This is especially prominent in dialects of Hungarian where personal proper names and other personal animate nouns tend to take the appropriate definite article, similarly to certain dialects of German detailed above. For example:

Words like  ("sibling, brother") and other words of relation do not require the first person possessive, but it is readily used in common speech, especially in familiar contexts:

The second-person pronoun can be used to emphasize a vocation when appropriate:  ("Why did you not give it to him, you fool?"),  ("Charlie, have you seen my glasses?"),  ("You shall yet hang for this, crooks!"), etc.

References

Grammatical cases